Test the Nation is a television programme, first broadcast in 2001 by BNN in the Netherlands. The concept is owned by Eyeworks Holding who license it to TV production companies around the world.

Show format
The format is designed to allow viewers to answer a number of questions in order to measure their IQ or their ability in some other 'intellectual' area. For instance, in the UK (where the show ran between 2002 and 2007) there have been editions of the show devoted to general knowledge, knowledge of the UK itself, and the English language. There is also an annual test of the year's events just before Christmas.

Typically there is a studio audience who answer the questions along with the viewer. The studio demography is broken down into categories often designed to challenge or affirm stereotypes. For example, in the United Kingdom, white-van men and fashion models are commonly thought to be less intelligent, whilst doctors and scientists are expected to score highly. The fun is in comparing your score against your compatriots. There is also a group of celebrities pitting their wits against the audience, and one or more 'experts', who comment on aspects of the particular show's topic.

Versions
The format has now been made around the world in countries including Australia, Germany, Belgium, Canada, the United Kingdom, the United States, Indonesia, Spain (Antena 3TV), New Zealand, Denmark, Japan, Ireland and in the Middle East on the Arabic language MBC1.

United Kingdom
The British version, made by Talent Television for the BBC, was originally presented by Anne Robinson and Phillip Schofield. It ran for 17 editions between 2002 and 2007. The BBC tests were devised and standardised by the academic Colin Cooper, of Queen's University Belfast, who was sometimes referred to on the programme as 'Sooperman Cooperman'.

Viewers could play along using interactive television, log onto the BBC website, or just use a pen and paper to keep score.

The first show, in May 2002, was an IQ test and the six groups of 50 studio participants included blondes, brunettes, teachers and students. They were pitted against a group of 10 celebrities including EastEnders star Adam Woodyatt, pop music presenter Fearne Cotton, Olympic athlete Jonathan Edwards and former Sunday Times editor and broadcaster Andrew Neil. The teachers came out on top. The last IQ test in the UK was shown on 27 August 2007, when the studio groups were reality show contestants, clairvoyants, surgeons, removal men, Robinsons, Wallaces and celebrities. In this episode Danny Wallace, a successful writer, made his first appearance as co-host. He replaced Phillip Schofield, who now works exclusively with ITV. Experts who joined Dr Colin Cooper on the IQ test panel have included Sylvia Herbert, a director of British Mensa (2002 and 2003) and Baroness Susan Greenfield, scientist and polymath (2004).

Although there was usually an end-of-year test in the UK each year around Christmas, there wasn't one at the end of 2006. But at the start of 2007 there was a similar programme broadcast on BBC One called Your Country Needs You, presented by Patrick Kielty, with the same general format.

From 2002 to 2004, the colour scheme used to change with every test. As of 2005, a red colour scheme was implemented for the questions and blue for the answer section. A bevel-like shape was added with the new graphics, title sequence and colour scheme, but it is unclear why.

The fonts used were Reaction Ultra (for the title) and a font called "iq font improved 2" for the question graphics. As of 2005, "DIN Mittelschrift" was used for the questions.

United States
The American version aired as a two-hour special on Fox TV on 9 June 2003 and on 5 March 2004 as Test the Nation 2. Hosted by Mark L. Walberg and Leeza Gibbons.

Ireland

Test the Nation is an RTÉ Television programme, based on the successful BBC concept, Test the Nation.

First airing on RTÉ One on 5 June 2006, the show follows the UK format almost identically. In studio, two presenters oversee proceedings, which feature 6 teams of 40 contestants from various sectors of society. Members of the public participate by SMS or via the internet. The Macromedia Flash applications used are identical to those used by the BBC. A trial version of the application appeared prior to the first quiz night, featuring 12 questions on a number of topics, including the Birmingham Six, the former occupants of the Grafton Street site now occupied by Brown Thomas, and which Irish alcohol company Toto Schillaci advertised for.

This version of Test the Nation covers the whole island of Ireland as opposed to just the Republic; thus there is overlap between the content of the RTÉ and BBC versions of the show. As opposed to the BBC system of division by nearest city (which let people in Ireland enter if they chose Belfast), RTÉ divide results by historical Irish county.

The first show
The show first aired on RTÉ One on 5 June 2006, with Miriam O'Callaghan and Ray D'Arcy overseeing proceedings. As well as historical Irish counties, 
other questions asked for demographic division included the participants preference for tea or cappuccino, and their support for Roy Keane or Mick McCarthy during The Saipan Incident.

Their in-studio teams were Hairdressers, Football fans, an extended family from County Clare, employees of Revenue, Estate Agents, a collection of people who had done their Leaving Certificate in 1986, and the "RTÉ Allstars", a collection of RTÉ presenters including Eddie Hobbs and Charlie Bird.

The show was nominally part of, and the last show in, an RTÉ series The Time of Our Lives, covering the 20 years from 1986 to 2006, during which the Irish economy changed the country unrecognisably.

The second show
This aired on 1 January 2007 and was presented by Miriam again but this time Craig Doyle was her co-host. It was a test of the nation's IQ. It was revealed that the county with the highest IQ was Monaghan. Panelists included Neil Delamere, Cathy Kelly and Aoibhinn Ní Shúilleabháin.

Canada
Test the Nation debuted in Canada 18 March 2007 on the Canadian Broadcasting Corporation with the episode Test the Nation: IQ. A second episode called Test the Nation: Watch Your Language was broadcast on 9 September 2007, a third episode aired on 20 January 2008, called Test the Nation: Trivia, and a fourth episode Test the Nation: Sports aired on Sunday 25 May at 8 pm (8:30 NT) on CBC Television. A fifth episode Test the Nation: Canada Eh? aired on Sunday 7 September at 8 pm (8:30 NT) on CBC Television.

The sixth episode called "Test the Nation IQ" was broadcast on 24 January 2010 and was the second version of the IQ edition. People were tested on their IQ through a test that was designed by Professor James Parker from Trent University and Professor Don Saklofske. Celebrities that had their IQ's tested included Justin Trudeau, Dragon's Den's W. Brett Wilson and Our Lady Peace's Jeremy Taggart. In an interesting twist, Test the Nation had professional hypnotherapist Donald Currie hypnotize members of each team to see if hypnosis could help them achieve better IQ test scores. 1/3 of the hypnotized group did experience a jump in IQ score of up to 10 points.

The Canadian show was hosted by Wendy Mesley and Brent Bambury for the first five editions, except Test the Nation: Sports, which was hosted by Ron MacLean and Wendy Mesley.  The sixth edition was hosted by George Stroumboulopoulos and Carole MacNeil.

In the Canadian version, celebrity guests are selected to represent one of six in-studio teams. The celebrity guests also take the test and the top celebrity's score is revealed on air. Test the Nation: Trivia featured celebrities: Farley Flex, Debbie Travis, Lorne Cardinal, Carlo Rota, Samantha Bee and Tricia Helfer. Test the Nation: Sports celebrity guests are Paul Coffey, Debra DiGiovanni, Alan Thicke, Brian Bailey, Victoria Pratt and Chris Murphy. All of the episodes were written by George Westerholm and Edward Kay.

Australia

The Australian version, titled Test Australia: The National IQ Test, was the most viewed television show in Australia in 2002. Versions of the program aired in 2003 and again in 2010.

Italy
The Italian version, titled Fratelli di Test, was aired in Italy in 2007.

Broadcast dates

UK
 The National IQ Test (11 May 2002)
 The National 2002 Test (23 December 2002)
 The National Relationship Test (22 March 2003)
 The National IQ Test 2003 (4 May 2003)
 The National Quiz (6 September 2003)
 The 2003 Test (22 December 2003)
 The Great British Test (20 March 2004)
 The National IQ Test 2004 (22 May 2004)
 The Popular Music Test (4 September 2004)
 The 2004 Test (19 December 2004)
 The Big Entertainment Test (12 March 2005)
 The 20th Century Test (4 June 2005)
 Know Your English Test (8 October 2005)
 The 2005 Test (18 December 2005)
 Know Your Planet Test (29 May 2006)
 The National IQ Test 2006 (2 September 2006)
 The National IQ Test 2007 (27 August 2007)

Canada
 Test the Nation: IQ (18 March 2007)
 Test the Nation: Watch Your Language (9 September 2007)
 Test the Nation: Trivia (20 January 2008)
 Test the Nation: Sports (25 May 2008)
 Test the Nation: Canada Eh? (7 September 2008)
 Test the Nation: IQ (24 January 2010)

References

External links
 
 Official BNN site (in Dutch)
 Official RTÉ site
 Official Canadian site
 Official FOX site (via Internet Archive)

2002 British television series debuts
BBC television game shows
Irish quiz shows